Ronald Wade Wright (born January 21, 1976) is an American former professional baseball player whose career spanned 11 seasons, from 1994 until 2004. During his career, spent entirely in the minor leagues with the exception of one major league game, he was used almost exclusively as a first baseman. Wright played one game in Major League Baseball (MLB), for the Seattle Mariners.

Wright's one major league game was on April 14, 2002, which he started as the designated hitter for Seattle against the Texas Rangers. In three plate appearances, Wright achieved the dubious distinction of striking out (second inning), hitting into a triple play (fourth inning), and hitting into a double play (sixth inning). He was replaced by Mark McLemore in the seventh inning; Seattle went on to win the game, 9–7. , Wright is the only player to serve as a designated hitter in his only MLB game.

After retiring from professional baseball, Wright earned a degree in pharmacy at Idaho State University and returned to Utah to work as a pharmacist. He married Annica in 1997, with whom he has four children.

References

External links

1976 births
Living people
Akron Aeros players
Altoona Curve players
American expatriate baseball players in Canada
Baseball players from Utah
Calgary Cannons players
Carolina Mudcats players
Chattanooga Lookouts players
Durham Bulls players
Greenville Braves players
Gulf Coast Braves players
Gulf Coast Pirates players
Louisville RiverBats players
Macon Braves players
Major League Baseball designated hitters
Nashville Sounds players
People from Delta, Utah
Seattle Mariners players
Sioux Falls Canaries players
Tacoma Rainiers players
Toledo Mud Hens players
American pharmacists
Idaho State University alumni